Cerașu is a commune in Prahova County, Muntenia, Romania. It is composed of six villages: Cerașu, Slon, Valea Borului, Valea Brădetului, Valea Lespezii and Valea Tocii.

Cerașu borders the following communes: Chiojdu (Buzău County) and Vama Buzăului (Brașov County) to the north; Măneciu to the west; Izvoarele and Drajna to the south; and Posești, Bătrâni, and Starchiojd to the east.

References

Communes in Prahova County
Localities in Muntenia